FC Slušovice is a Czech football club, playing in the town of Slušovice. The club was founded in 1929. The club won the 1994–95 Moravian–Silesian Football League and played one season in the Czech 2. Liga, finishing 7th in the 1995–96 season. It currently plays in the Zlínský krajský 1.A třída skupina A, which is in the sixth tier of Czech football.

References

External links
Profile at WorldFootball.net

 
Football clubs in the Czech Republic
Association football clubs established in 1929
Zlín District